Lindsay Wong is a Canadian writer, whose memoir The Woo-Woo: How I Survived Ice Hockey, Drug Raids, Demons, and My Crazy Chinese Family was published in 2018. The book, a humorous memoir about her Chinese Canadian family's history of mental illness, won the 2019 Hubert Evans Non-Fiction Prize and was a shortlisted finalist for the 2019 Hilary Weston Writers' Trust Prize for Nonfiction.

Originally from Vancouver, British Columbia, Wong wrote the book while pursuing graduate studies at Columbia University in New York City.

The Woo-Woo was selected for the 2019 edition of Canada Reads, where it was defended by Joe Zee, and was longlisted for the 2019 Stephen Leacock Memorial Medal for Humour.

Wong's latest book, Tell Me Pleasant Things About Immortality: Stories, came out in 2023 to great acclaim.

References

External links

21st-century Canadian non-fiction writers
21st-century Canadian women writers
Canadian memoirists
Canadian people of Chinese descent
Canadian writers of Asian descent
Writers from Vancouver
Living people
Year of birth missing (living people)
21st-century memoirists
Canadian women memoirists